This is a list of museums in East Timor.

Museums in East Timor 
 National Museum and Culture Center of East Timor
 Timorese Resistance Archive and Museum
 Centro Nacional Chega!
 Xanana Gusmão Reading Room

See also 
 List of museums

External links 	
 Timorese Resistance Archive & Museum

 
East Timor
Museums
East Timor
Museums